Mademoiselle is a 2001 French comedy film directed by Philippe Lioret. It was entered into the 23rd Moscow International Film Festival.

Plot
At a company party Claire sees three actors who work as an improvisational theatre. After the party she misses the bus but the three artists have a car and offer to take her to the railway station. When they are underway it turns out the artists have already a new engagement. They are supposed to perform at a wedding party the very same day. Claire accompanies them and misses her train. She falls in love with one of the artists. They spend the night together.

Cast
 Sandrine Bonnaire as Claire Canselier
 Jacques Gamblin as Pierre Cassini
 Isabelle Candelier as Alice Cohen
 Zinedine Soualem as Karim Coutard
 Jacques Boudet as Gilbert Frémont
 Patrick Mercado as Nounours
 Philippe Beglia as Philippe Carioux
 Maryvonne Schiltz as Elisabeth Carioux
 Gérard Lartigau as Henri Blasco
 Blandine Pélissier  (credited as Blandine Pelissier) as the pharmacist
 Olivier Cruveiller as Villeval
 Alain Cauchi as Granier

Accolades

References

External links
 

2001 films
2001 comedy films
2000s French-language films
French comedy films
Films directed by Philippe Lioret
Films scored by Philippe Sarde
2000s French films